Sky 3 is the third album by English/Australian instrumental progressive rock band Sky, released in 1981.  It reached number three in the British Albums chart. It was the first album recorded after Francis Monkman's departure from the group, with Steve Gray replacing him on keyboards.

In 2015 Esoteric Recordings continued their schedule of remasters and expanded releases with this recording.

Track listing

2015 two disc reissue edition

Personnel
Sky
 John Williams – guitars
 Steve Gray – piano, synthesizer, harpsichord, clavinet
 Herbie Flowers – bass guitar, double bass, tuba
 Tristan Fry – drums, marimba, vibraphone, waterphone
 Kevin Peek – guitars

Other personnel
 Malcolm Davies – Mastering
 Sky, Haydn Bendall, Tony Clark – Production

Charts

Certifications

References

1981 albums
Sky (English/Australian band) albums
Ariola Records albums